Pedro Garay Núñez (born 19 October 1961) is a Paraguayan former footballer who played as a right midfielder. He was also part of Paraguay's squad for the 1983 Copa América tournament.

Honours

Club
 Sol de América
 Paraguayan Primera División: 1986

 Cerro Porteño
 Paraguayan Primera División: 1987, 1990, 1992
 Torneo República: 1991, 1995

 Oriente Petrolero
 Copa Bolivia: 1992

 Sporting Cristal
 Peruvian Primera División: 1994, 1995, 1996

References

External links
 

1961 births
Living people
Paraguayan footballers
Paraguayan expatriate footballers
Paraguay international footballers
Association football midfielders
1983 Copa América players
Cerro Porteño players
Club Sol de América footballers
Club Libertad footballers
Oriente Petrolero players
Paraguayan Primera División players
Bolivian Primera División players
Peruvian Primera División players
Sporting Cristal footballers